Mitchell Kendall (–) was a blacksmith and state legislator in Texas for Harrison County, Texas. He was born in Georgia as a slave. He was brought to Texas about 1850. He served as a voter registrar in Harrison County and at the 1868 Texas Constitutional Convention where he voted to separate Texas into three states. He was elected as a Republican to the Texas House of Representatives for the Twelfth Legislature from 1870 to 1871. He had a wife Adeline and five children.

Kendall was a member of the Ebenezer United Methodist Church in New Town neighborhood of Marshall, Texas. He was buried at the Old Powder Mill Cemetery in Marshall.

References

19th-century American politicians
American former slaves
1822 births
1885 deaths
Year of birth uncertain
Year of death uncertain
Date of birth unknown
Date of death unknown
African-American state legislators in Texas
African-American politicians during the Reconstruction Era
People from Georgia (U.S. state)
People from Harrison County, Texas
Radical Republicans
Republican Party members of the Texas House of Representatives